Lvea  is a khum (commune) of Bavel District in Battambang Province in north-western Cambodia.

Villages

 Lvea
 Doun Nhaem
 Chamkar
 Dangkao
 Ream Sena
 Doun Aok
 Ping Pong
 Svay Prey
 Boeng Samraong
 Kbal Spean
 Lvea Chas
 Ta Ny

References

Communes of Battambang province
Bavel District